Jarnołtówek  is a village in the administrative district of Gmina Głuchołazy, within Nysa County, Opole Voivodeship, in south-western Poland, close to the Czech border.

The village has a population of 820.

Places of interest
 the Saint Bartholomew church
 the dam
 the Opawskie Mountains Landscape Park
 the Biskupia Kopa mountain
 the mountain caves
 the restaurant "Włoski Smak"

References

Villages in Nysa County